Ippolit Karlovich Al'tani (Altani Ipolit Karlovich; 27 May [OS 15 May] 184617 February 1919) was a Russian Empire conductor, choirmaster and  violinist.

Al'tani was born in the south of Ukraine. In 1866 he graduated from Saint Petersburg conservatory as a violinist (studied under Henryk Wieniawski) and composer (studied with  Nikolai Zaremba, and Anton Rubinstein). In 1867-82 he worked as a conductor and choirmaster at the Russian opera in Kiev. Al'tani's activity contributed to the development of musical stage skill in Ukraine. In 1882-1906 Al'tani was chief conductor of the Bolshoi Theatre in Moscow.

Al'tani had a significant association with Tchaikovsky.  He conducted the first performance of the 1812 Overture (1882) and the first performances at the Bolshoi Theatre of his operas Mazeppa (1884), The Enchantress (1890), The Queen of Spades (1891) and Iolanta (1893).

Al'tani also conducted the 1888 Moscow premiere of the revised 1872 version of Mussorgsky's Boris Godunov, and the world premiere of Rachmaninoff's Aleko (1893).

He died in Moscow.

Bibliography
[I. K. Al'tani] И. К. Альтани..., «Русская музыкальная газета», 1902, No. 41; 
[Ippolit Karlovich Al'tani] Ипполит Карлович Альтани. (По поводу 25-летия его дирижёрской деятельности), в кн.: Ежегодник императорских театров, в. 6–7, [СПБ], 1909.

References

Conductors (music) from the Russian Empire
1846 births
1919 deaths
Musicians from Dnipro
Pupils of Nikolai Zaremba
Pyotr Ilyich Tchaikovsky
Saint Petersburg Conservatory alumni
19th-century conductors (music)
19th-century musicians from the Russian Empire
20th-century Russian conductors (music)
Russian male conductors (music)
20th-century Russian male musicians